Falculiferidae is a family of mites belonging to the order Sarcoptiformes.

Genera 

Genera:
 Afrophagus Gaud, 1976
 Atyeonia Gaud, 1966
 Byersalges Atyeo & Winchell, 1984

References 

Acari